Ignaz Umlauf (1746-1796) was an Austrian composer. He was Kapellmeister of the new German National Singspiel of Emperor Joseph II beginning from 1778 to his death. His son Michael Umlauf (1781-1842) was also a notable composer, and his daughter Elisabeth, mother of the composer Gustav Hölzel, was an operatic contralto.

Works
Die Bergknappen Singspiel  in 1778, featuring Caterina Cavalieri, and the first Singspiel by an Austrian composer to be performed in Vienna.
Die schöne Schusterin - notable for two extra arias "O welch' ein Leben," for tenor, (WoO 91/1) and "Soll ein Schuh nicht drücken" (WoO 91/2) composed by Beethoven for insertion into the Singspiel's revival in 1795.

External links

References

1746 births
1796 deaths
18th-century composers
18th-century male musicians